Maine Central Railroad Class C locomotives were intended for main line passenger service.  They were of 4-6-2 wheel arrangement in the Whyte notation, or " 2'C1' " in UIC classification. They replaced earlier class N 4-6-0 locomotives beginning in 1907. Class C locomotives pulled named passenger trains until replacement by diesel locomotives after World War II.

Sub-classes
All were built in American Locomotive Company's plant at Schenectady, New York and were numbered from 450 to 470 as delivered. The original C class were builders numbers 42439 & 42440 delivered in 1907, 46036-46038 in 1909, 47731 in 1910, and 49205-49206 in 1911. Sub-class C-1 consisted of builders numbers 50940 & 50941 built in 1912, and 52985-52986 & 53291 completed in 1913.

Sub-class C-3
The last five Maine Central Pacifics were built with booster engines. Building of new 4-6-2s was interrupted by World War I when the United States Railroad Administration (USRA) authorized construction of non-standard class O 4-6-0s because Maine Central Pacifics were so much smaller than USRA Light Pacifics. The final two class C engines were builders numbers 65554 and 65555 delivered in 1924. Number 470 was preserved in Waterville, Maine after pulling the last Maine Central steam-powered train on 13 June 1954.

Replacement
The last steam locomotives built for Maine Central were class D 4-6-4s numbered 701 and 702 from Baldwin Locomotive Works in 1930. The Budd Company Flying Yankee train set and unstreamlined  oil-electric rail car number 901 arrived in 1935. EMD E7s numbered 705 through 711 began pulling main line passenger trains in 1946. Steam-generator-equipped road switchers pulled a declining number of branch line passenger trains from 1950 until Maine Central discontinued all passenger service in 1960.

References 

Steam locomotives of the United States
4-6-2 locomotives
ALCO locomotives
C
Railway locomotives introduced in 1907
Standard gauge locomotives of the United States